The 1940 U.S. National Championships (now known as the US Open) was a tennis tournament that took place on the outdoor grass courts at the West Side Tennis Club, Forest Hills in New York City, United States. The tournament ran from 2 September until 9 September. It was the 60th staging of the U.S. National Championships and the second Grand Slam tennis event of the year because of the cancellation of Wimbledon and the French Championships due to World War II. Don McNeill capped an outstanding season with his win over Bobby Riggs in the finals of the men's singles.  Earlier in the year McNeill won the U.S. Men's Intercollegiate Singles Championships for Kenyon College, defeating Joe Hunt of Navy.  A dramatic moment occurred in this 1940 National Championships during the men's singles quarter-final match between 1943 national champion, Joe Hunt and third seeded Frank Kovacs.  Kovacs had the reputation as a court clown, and early in the third set, Kovacs' antics with the gallery compelled Hunt to sit down on the baseline and refuse to play until the umpire stopped the disturbance. Hunt ignored several of Kovacs' serves, allowing them to harmlessly fly by. In short order, Kovacs also sat on his baseline and Forest Hills experienced what was called "tennis' first sit-down strike."  About five minutes went by with the crowd alternately cheering and jeering.  When order was restored, Hunt went on to win the match in straight sets.

Finals

Men's singles

 Donald McNeill defeated  Bobby Riggs  4–6, 6–8, 6–3, 6–3, 7–5

Women's singles

 Alice Marble defeated  Helen Jacobs  6–2, 6–3

Men's doubles
 Jack Kramer /  Ted Schroeder defeated  Gardnar Mulloy /  Henry Prusoff 6–4, 8–6, 9–7

Women's doubles
 Sarah Palfrey Cooke /  Alice Marble defeated  Dorothy Bundy /  Marjorie Gladman Van Ryn 6–4, 6–4

Mixed doubles
 Alice Marble /   Bobby Riggs defeated  Dorothy Bundy /  Jack Kramer 9–7, 6–1

References

External links
Official US Open website

 
U.S. National Championships
U.S. National Championships (tennis) by year
U.S. National Championships
U.S. National Championships
U.S. National Championships